The calimocho or  kalimotxo is a drink consisting of equal parts red wine and cola-based soft drink. The concoction dates back to the 1920s in Spain, but was relatively uncommon as Coca-Cola was not manufactured in the country at that time. The first Coca-Cola factory opened in Spain in 1953, and the drink was "reborn" and given its current name in 1972. It has since become a classic of the Basque Country region, in large part due to its simple mixture, accessibility of ingredients, and cheap cost. It is also known as katemba in South Africa, cátembe in Mozambique, bambus in Croatia, jote in Chile, and jesus juice in Argentina.

References 

Spanish cuisine
Spanish alcoholic drinks
Chilean wine
Chilean alcoholic drinks
Basque cuisine
Cocktails with wine
Cola
Cocktails with cola
South African cuisine
South African alcoholic drinks
Mozambican cuisine
Croatian alcoholic drinks
Argentine cuisine